Tango: Zero Hour (Nuevo Tango: Hora Zero in Spanish) is an album by Ástor Piazzolla and his Quinteto Nuevo Tango (in English: New Tango Quintet, often loosely referred to as his second quintet).  It was released in September 1986 on American Clavé, and re-released on Pangaea Records in 1988.

Piazzolla considered this his greatest album. Rolling Stone commented on the Pangaea reissue of the album, comparing Piazzolla's fusion of form, improvisation, and dynamics to contemporary classical music, jazz, and rock & roll, respectively. Robert Christgau of The Village Voice also commented on Piazzolla's fusion of classical and jazz music.

Track listing 
All tracks written by Astor Piazzolla.
"Tanguedia III" – 4:39
"Milonga del ángel" – 6:31
"Concierto para quinteto" – 9:06
"Milonga loca" – 3:09
"Michelangelo '70" – 2:52
"Contrabajissimo" – 10:19
"Mumuki" – 9:33

Musicians
Ástor Piazzolla – bandoneon, arranger
Hector Console – bass
Horacio Malvicino – guitar
Fernando Suarez Paz – violin
Pablo Ziegler – piano

Technical personnel 
 Greg Calbi – Mastering
 Jon Fausty – Engineer, mixing
 Kip Hanrahan – Producer, engineer
 Nancy Hanrahan – Associate producer
 Scott Marcus – Executive producer
 Charles Reilly – Photography
 Shawna Stobie – Assistant engineer, mixing assistant

References 

1986 albums
Astor Piazzolla albums